Mollie Milligan is an American actress, and co-owner/operator of Boxcar Creative, in Dallas, TX. She is also co-founder of Table 31 Productions, which began shooting the psychological thriller Element in June, 2014.

Career
In 2007, Mollie Milligan and her business partner, Brian Fabian, began searching for a filmmaking opportunity. The couple spent the next two years visiting the Texas Lions Camp in Kerrville, Texas, as well as the homes of 5 special needs children around the state of Texas. The result is the documentary Different Abilities: Not Like the Others.

The film won the American Airlines First Altitude Award: American Association Of People With Disabilities, and the 2009 Accolade Award of Excellence (La Jolla, California).

Filmography

Television

References

External links
 
 Boxcar Creative

American film actresses
People from El Paso, Texas
Living people
1978 births
American television actresses
Actresses from Texas
21st-century American actresses